The 2011 Formula Abarth season was the seventh season of the former Formula Azzurra, and the second under its guise of "Formula Abarth". It was the first split in European and Italian series.

The Italian Championship began on 17 April in Vallelunga, while European Championship on 8 May in Valencia. They finished together on 16 October in Monza.

Teams and drivers

Race calendar and results
On 19 November 2010, the calendar for both series was presented in a press conference held in Varano.

 1 Fastest lap recorded by Yoshitaka Kuroda, but he was ineligible to score the fastest lap point.

Championship standings
Points were awarded as follows:

Italian Championship

Drivers' standings

Teams' standings

European Championship

Drivers' standings

Teams' standings

Rookies' standings

References

External links
 European Series
 Italian Series

Formula Abarth
Formula Abarth
Formula Abarth
Abarth